The following is a discography of production by Terrace Martin.

Singles produced 
 2008
 "Neva Have 2 Worry" (Snoop Dogg featuring Uncle Chucc)
 2009
 "L.O.V.E" (Frank Nitt featuring DJ Quik & J. Black)
 "I'm Burnt" (Kurupt featuring Problem)
 2010
 "Upside Down" (Snoop Dogg featuring Nipsey Hussle & Problem)
 "Frontline" (Crazy Toones featuring WC)
 "In Gotti We Trust" (Kurupt featuring Xzibit)
 "Questions" (Kurupt featuring Uncle Chucc)
 "Go Girl" (Frank Nitt featuring Problem)
 2011
 "On Point" (Strong Arm Steady featuring Too Short)
 2016
 "Ghetto Boy" (Remix) (Lalah Hathaway featuring Snoop Dogg)

2004

213 - The Hard Way 
 12. "Joysticc"

Shawnna - Worth tha Weight 
 14. "Super Freak"

Chico & Coolwadda - Parallel 
 02. "Parallel"

2005

Various Artists - Boss'n Up 
 03. "No Sticks, No Seeds" (9 Inch Dix)
 04. "Shake That Shit" (Tiffany Foxx feat. Snoop Dogg & Young Walt)

Warren G - In the Mid-Nite Hour 
 10. "PYT" (feat. Snoop Dogg & Nate Dogg)

Snoop Dogg - Bigg Snoop Dogg Presents...Welcome to tha Chuuch: Da Album 
 02. "Shake That Shit" (Tiffany Foxx feat. Snoop Dogg & Young Walt)
 06. "Sunshine" (J. Black) (Produced with Marlon Williams)
 06. "If" (Wendi & YN feat. Snoop Dogg & J. Black)

2006

Snoop Dogg - Tha Blue Carpet Treatment 
 08. "Gangbangin' 101" (feat. The Game)

2007

Snoop Dogg - Snoop Dogg Presents The Big Squeeze 
 15. "Be Thankful" (Terrace Martin, J. Black & Uncle Chucc)

Talib Kweli - Eardrum 
 10. "Give 'Em Hell" (feat. Lyfe Jennings) (Produced with Battlecat)
  Sample Credit: "I'm Glad You're Mine" by Al Green

Terrace Martin - Signal Flow 
 01. "Message From MC Wack"
 02. "Signal Flow Intro" (feat. Snoop Dogg)
 03. "Ridin'" (feat. Snoop Dogg, Problem & Scar)
 04. "To The Top" (feat. The Game, Snoop Dogg & Uncle Chucc)
 05. "Enemy Lines" (feat. Busta Rhymes, Chauncy Black & Spliff Starr)
 06. "Watch Me Fall" (feat. Tru Life, Snoop Dogg & J. Black)
 07. "Fear & Respect" (feat. Snoop Dogg)
 08. "Be Thankful"
 09. "Hoe Hoe Hoe" (feat. Nate Dogg & Snoop Dogg)
 10. "All Night" (feat. Kurupt, Mykestro & Problem)
 11. "Bitch" (feat. Too Short & Yung Walt)
 12. "Problem Smoke Break For Terrace"
 13. "No Violence" (feat. Kurupt)
 14. "Blast/Apologize" (feat. Snoop Dogg & Kurupt)
 15. "Ridin' Music" (feat. Kurupt & Problem)
 16. "Westside" (feat. Snoop Dogg, J. Black & Tone)
 17. "Conversation For The People" (feat. Problem)
 18. "Listen" (feat. Problem)

2008

Snoop Dogg - Ego Trippin' 
 05. "Neva Have 2 Worry" (feat. Uncle Chucc)
 14. "Been Around Tha World"
 00. "Shootem Up" (feat. Daz Dillinger)

Glasses Malone - The Electric Chair 
 29. "Just Another Day" (feat. Bloc Boyz)

Lalah Hathaway - Self Portrait 
 07. "1 Mile"
 11. "UDO"

Murs - Murs for President 
 09. "Time Is Now" (feat. Snoop Dogg & LaToya Williams)
 13. "A Part of Me"

Terrace Martin - Locke High (DJ Drama Edition) 
 01. "Intro" (feat. Snoop Dogg)
 02. "Do What I Do" (feat. Uncle Chucc & T. Lee)
 03. "Myspace Rappers" (feat. Problem)
 04. "Bounce, Rock, Skate" (feat. DJ Drama, DJ Quik, Kurupt & Snoop Dogg)
 05. "End of My Jam"
 06. "I'm Good" (feat. T. Lee & Problem)
 07. "I'm Toe Up (Remix)" (feat. DJ Felli Fel, DJ Quik, Problem, Kurupt & Snoop Dogg)
 08. "Hello" (feat. DJ Quik, Tone, J. Black & Kurupt)
 09. "How The Gangstas Do" (feat. Snoop Dogg & J. Black)
 10. "No Violence" (feat. Kurupt)
 11. "Sit Back" (feat. La the Darkman & Willie the Kid)
 12. "He's a Problem" (feat. Problem)
 13. "Hater PSA"
 14. "Haters" (feat. Uncle Chucc & T. Lee)
 15. "Misunderstood" (feat. YN)
 16. "Ridin' & Rollin'" (feat. Snoop Dogg, Problem & Scar)
 17. "GT" (feat. T. Lee)
 18. "Ridaman" (feat. Snoop Dogg)
 19. "Be Like Me" (feat. T. Lee & Uncle Chucc)
 20. "Stay Humble" (feat. J. Black & Uncle Chucc)

2009

Johnny Cash - Johnny Cash Remixed 
 04. "I Walk the Line" (feat. Snoop Dogg)

Kurupt 
 00. "Build You Up, Tear You Down" (feat. Snoop Dogg & Soopafly)

DJ Ill Will & DJ Rockstar: Marleik - Perfect Timing 
 12. "Secret Crush"

DJ Quik & Kurupt - BlaQKout 
 11. "The Appeal" (Produced with DJ Quik)

Lil Bam - The G.R.I.N.D. 
 03. "Change The Hood" (feat. Marleik)

DJ Quik 
 00. "Blueline Family Runnin' Thangs" (feat. Terrace Martin)

Snoop Dogg - Malice n Wonderland 
 03. "2 Minute Warning"
 09. "Upside Down" (feat. Nipsey Hussle & Problem) (Produced with Jason Martin)

2010

Snoop Dogg 
 00. "ICU" (feat. Terrace Martin)

Kurupt - Streetlights 
 01. "Intro"
 02. "I'm Burnt" (feat. Problem)
 03. "Questions" (feat. Uncle Chucc)
 04. "In Gotti We Trust" (feat. Xzibit)
 05. "Face Down" (feat. Terrace Martin, Tone & J. Black) (Produced with Larrance Dopson)
 07. "All That I Want" (feat. Snoop Dogg & J. Black)
 08. "I'm Drunk" (feat. J. Black)
 09. "Scrape" (feat. Terrace Martin, Virginia Slim & Big Tri)
 11. "I'm The Man" (feat. J. Black)
 12. "I'm Burnt (Remix)" (feat. Roscoe, Snoop Dogg & Problem)
 13. "Streetlights" (feat. Tone)
 14. "Bounce, Rock, Skate (Kurupted Mix)" (feat. DJ Drama, DJ Quik, Terrace Martin & Snoop Dogg)
 00. "Murder Fitness" (feat. Terrace Martin)

Crazy Toones 
 00. "Frontline" (feat. WC)

Brandi Kane - The Dopeman's Daughter 
 17. "Keep It Close" (feat. Stacee Adamz & J. Black)

Frank Nitt - Jewels in my Backpack (EP) 
 01. "Zoned Out" (feat. Kurupt)
 02. "Go Girl" (feat. Problem)
 03. "H.A.T.E."
 04. "Psychedelic Freaky Girl"
 05. "L.O.V.E." (feat. DJ Quik & J. Black)
 06. "HollyHood"

Terrace Martin - Here, My Dear 
 01. "Intro" (feat. Tiffany Hobbs)
 02. "Love Prelude"
 03. "Thing For You" (feat. Tone Trezure & J. Black)
 04. "Interlude Terrace Martin & Devi Dev"
 05. "Give Me Some of You" (feat. Kendrick Lamar)
 06. "I Had No Idea" (feat. Kendrick Lamar)
 07. "Show Her The Way" (feat. Kurupt, Lady G (Da Real Deal), Problem & Dom Kennedy)
 08. "Hey Girl" (feat. Snoop Dogg & J. Black)
 09. "Interlude Terrace Martin, Devi Dev & Charlie Wilson"
 10. "Special" (feat. U-n-i & Charlie Wilson)
 11. "Interlude Terrace Martin & Devi Dev"
 12. "I'm Done" (feat. Problem & Nico)
 13. "Cheat" (feat. Snoop Dogg & Problem)
 14. "Interlude Terrace Martin & Devi Dev"
 15. "KOO KOO CYCO LOCO " (feat. Bad Lucc & Tee Lee)
 16. "Makings of You" (feat. Kurupt & Overdoz)
 17. "Call Me" (feat. Chris Starr)
 18. "Interlude Terrace Martin & Devi Dev"
 19. "What You Won't Do For Love" (feat. Don Dolla)
 20. "Roll Up" (feat. Wiz Khalifa & Overdoz)
 21. "Expectations" (feat. Murs, Badd Lucc & Lovely Jean)
 22. "Interlude Terrace Martin & Devi Dev"
 23. "Here, My Dear"

2011

Murs & Terrace Martin - Melrose 
 01. "We on Melrose"
 02. "Fresh Kicks"
 03. "It's No Surprise"
 04. "We Got Something"
 05. "She's a Prostitute"
 06. "Ding Dong"
 07. "Dandruff"
 08. "Hoodrat Blues"
 09. "She's a Loser"
 10. "Thank You"
 11. "Cheating on Me"
 12. "Thing For You"
 13. "Doin Me"
 14. "Hand In The Sky"

Strong Arm Steady - Arms & Hammers 
 07. "Blow My Horn" (feat. Kurupt)
 10. "On Point" (feat. Too Short)

Snoop Dogg - PuffPuffPassTuesdays 
 00. "Keep Going"

Terrace Martin - Terrace Martin & Devi Dev Present... The Sex EP 
 01. "Sex Intro" (feat. Hi-Tek & Kenneth Crouch)
 02. "Sex Prelude" (feat. T. Lee)
 03. "Never Stop Loving You" (feat. 9th Wonder)
 04. "With You" (feat. J. Black & Apage)
 05. "In The Sheets" (feat. Lloyd)
 06. "Cum Baby" (feat. Wow Jones)
 07. "All The Things" (feat. Kenneth Crouch)
 08. "Him & Her (Interlude)"
 09. "Climax" (feat. Problem)
 10. "All This Love" (feat. Kenneth Crouch)
 11. "2 Court" (feat. Ill Camile, J. Black * Kenneth Crouch)

Kendrick Lamar - Section.80 
 15. "Ab-Soul's Outro" (feat. Ab-Soul)

Jay Rock - Follow Me Home 
 12. "Just Like Me" (feat. J. Black)
 15. "M.O.N.E.Y." (feat. J. Black)

Game - Hoodmorning (No Typo) 
 08. "Out of Towner"

Glasses Malone - Beach Cruiser 
 15. "Feel Good Music" (feat. Latoya Williams)

Glasses Malone - The Electric Chair 
 29. "Just Another Day" (Bloc Boyz)

2012

Kendrick Lamar - good kid, m.A.A.d city 
 08. "m.A.A.d city" (featuring MC Eiht) (produced with Sounwave & THC)
 11. "Real" (featuring Anna Wise)

2013

Snoop Lion - Reincarnated 
 10. "The Good Good" (featuring Iza) (produced with Kyle Townsend)

Talib Kweli - Prisoner of Conscious 
 14. "Favela Love" (featuring Seu Jorge)

Terrace Martin - 3ChordFold 
 01. "Ab-Soul's Intro" (featuring Ab-Soul)
 02. "Triangle Ship" (featuring Kendrick Lamar) (produced with 9th Wonder)
 03. "Get Away" 
 04. "Something Else" (featuring Problem) (produced with 9th Wonder)
 05. "Over Time" (featuring Musiq Soulchild)
 06. "No Wrong No Right" (featuring Robert Glasper and James Fauntleroy)
 08. "Move On" (produced with 9th Wonder)
 09. "Motivation" (featuring Wiz Khalifa and Brevi)
 10. "Happy Home (Freeloader, Renter, Buyer)" 
 12. "You're the One" (featuring Ty Dolla $ign)
 13. "I'm For Real" (featuring Snoop Dogg and Lalah Hathaway)
 14. "Gone" (featuring Robert Glasper) (produced with Quincy Jones)

Stalley - Honest Cowboy 
 07. "NineteenEighty7" (featuring Schoolboy Q)

Robert Glasper Experiment - Black Radio 2 
 07. "Persevere" (featuring Snoop Dogg, Lupe Fiasco and Luke James) (produced with Robert Glasper)

2014

Various Artists - 9th Wonder Presents: Jamla Is the Squad 
 14. Terrace Martin - "Shinin' Star" (produced with 9th Wonder)

Courtney Noelle - Love on the Run 
 09. "You Got Me" (featuring Wiz Khalifa)

YG - My Krazy Life 
 09. "Really Be (Smokin N Drinkin)" (featuring Kendrick Lamar) (produced with Ty Dolla $ign and Chordz)
 14. "Sorry Momma" (featuring Ty Dolla $ign) (produced with DJ Mustard)

Terrace Martin - 3ChordFold Pulse 
 01. "Pulse" (featuring Preston Harris)
 02. "It's Yours" (featuring Robert Glasper, James Fauntleroy and Thundercat)
 03. "You and Me" (featuring Preston Harris)
 04. "Lets Go Get Stoned" (featuring Snoop Dogg and Tone Trezure)
 05. "Come and Get Me" (featuring Wyann Vaughn)
 06. "Poetic Justice (Live In New York)" (Kendrick Lamar)
 07. "All The Things" (ft. Don Dolla)
 08. "Angel" (featuring 9th Wonder) (produced with 9th Wonder)
 09. "Never Have 2 Worry (Live In New York)" (Snoop Dogg featuring Uncle Chucc)
 10. "The Last Song" (featuring Teedra Moses)
 11. "Alrite"  (featuring J. Black)
 12. "Beautiful" (featuring Wyann Vaughn and Preston Harris)
 13. "Butterfly (Live)" (featuring Robert Glasper, Ethan Farmer, Craig Brockman, Maroln Willia and Ronald Bruner)

Ab-Soul - These Days... 
 09. "Kendrick Lamar's Interlude" (featuring Kendrick Lamar)

Big K.R.I.T. - Cadillactica 
 13. "Angels"

2015

Kendrick Lamar - To Pimp a Butterfly
 02. "For Free? (Interlude)"
 03. "King Kunta" (produced with Sounwave)
 05. "These Walls" (featuring Bilal, Anna Wise and Thundercat) (produced with Larrance Dopson and Sounwave) 
 08. "For Sale? (Interlude)" (produced with Taz Arnold AKA Ti$A and Sounwave)
 12. "Complexion (A Zulu Love)" (featuring Rapsody) (produced with Thundercat, Sounwave and Antydote) 
 13. "The Blacker the Berry" (produced with Boi-1da and KOZ)

YG - Still Brazy
 05. "Twist My Fingaz"
 11. "Bool, Balm & Bollective"

Travis Scott - Rodeo
14. "Apple Pie"  (co-produced with Travis Scott, Mike Dean and 1500 or Nothin')

Lalah Hathaway
 "Ghetto Boy" (Remix) (featuring Snoop Dogg)

2016
Kendrick Lamar - Untitled Unmastered
 05. “untitled 05|09.21.2014”

2017

Kendrick Lamar - Damn
 06. "Loyalty" (featuring Rihanna) (produced with DJ Dahi, Sounwave and Anthony Tiffith)

Overdoz - 2008
 04. "House Party"
 10. "ULETTHEHOMIEHIT

Problem - Selfish
 09. "Ain't Like You" (featuring Ne-Yo & Terrace Martin)

2018

alt-J - Reduxer
 07. "Last Year" (featuring GoldLink) (Terrace Martin Remix)

2020

Busta Rhymes - Extinction Level Event 2: The Wrath of God
 11. "Master Fard Muhammad" (featuring Rick Ross) (produced with Hi-Tek)

References

External links 

Production discographies
Hip hop discographies
Discographies of American artists